Ballistol (meaning 'Ballistic Oil') is a mineral oil-based chemical which advertises that it has many uses. It is manufactured and distributed by Ballistol GmbH in the Bavarian village of Aham and was originally intended for cleaning, lubricating, and protecting firearms.

Description
The product originated from Germany before World War I, after the German military requested an 'all-around' oil and cleaner for their rifles and equipment. The German military used it from 1905 to 1945.

The chemical is a yellowish clear liquid with a consistency expected of a light oil. However, when it comes in contact with water it emulsifies, becoming a thick creamy white substance. It has a sweet and mildly pungent smell similar to black licorice. It is distributed in liquid and aerosol forms. The aerosol uses butane or propane as a propellant.

It advertises it has no carcinogens. Some other similar chemicals contain petro-chemicals which can pollute the environment if improperly handled.

Ingredients 
According to a specification from December 2002:
 pharmaceutical white oil: CAS RN 8042-47-5
 Oleic acid: CAS RN 112-80-1
 C-5 alcohols: CAS RN 78-83-1; CAS RN 137-32-6; CAS RN 100-51-6
 different essential oils to perfume Ballistol

According to 2013 MSDS:

Mineral oil (liquid paraffin)
Potassium oleate (salt of oleic acid)
Ammonium oleate
Benzyl alcohol
Amyl alcohol
Isobutyl alcohol
Benzyl acetate
Anethole
Isohexane (aerosol only)

See also 
 WD-40

References 

MSDS for Ballistol (Sept. 2013)
Basic information on Ballistol and products (March 2016)

External links 
Ballistol (Germany)
Ballistol (UK)
Ballistol (USA)

Firearms
Lubricants
Brand name materials